Siratus beauii is a species of sea snail, a marine gastropod mollusk in the family Muricidae, the murex snails or rock snails.

Description

Distribution
This species occurs in the Caribbean Sea, the Gulf of Mexico and the Lesser Antilles.A deepwater species trapped alive at depths no less than around 180–200 meters, off West coast Barbados.

References

 Jensen, R. H. (1997). A Checklist and Bibliography of the Marine Molluscs of Bermuda. Unp. , 547 pp
 Rosenberg, G., F. Moretzsohn, and E. F. García. 2009. Gastropoda (Mollusca) of the Gulf of Mexico, pp. 579–699 in Felder, D.L. and D.K. Camp (eds.), Gulf of Mexico–Origins, Waters, and Biota. Biodiversity. Texas A&M Press, College Station, Texas.
 Merle D., Garrigues B. & Pointier J.-P. (2011) Fossil and Recent Muricidae of the world. Part Muricinae. Hackenheim: Conchbooks. 648 pp
 Houart, R. (2014). Living Muricidae of the world. Muricinae. Murex, Promurex, Haustellum, Bolinus, Vokesimurex and Siratus. Harxheim: ConchBooks. 197 pp.
 Garrigues B . & Lamy D. 2018, 218. Muricidae récoltés au cours de la campagne KARUBENTHOS 2 du MNHN dans les eaux profondes de Guadeloupe (Antilles Françaises) et description de trois nouvelles espèces des genres Pagodula et Pygmaepterys (Mollusca, Gastropoda). Xenophora Taxonomy 20: 34-52

External links
 Fischer, P. & Bernardi, A.C. (1857). Descriptions d'espèces nouvelles. Journal de Conchyliologie. 5(3): 292-300, pls 8-9.

Muricidae
Gastropods described in 1857